Izmailsky Uyezd (Измаильский уезд) was one of the subdivisions of the Bessarabia Governorate of the Russian Empire. It was situated in the southern part of the governorate. Its administrative centre was Izmail.

Demographics
At the time of the Russian Empire Census of 1897, Izmailsky Uyezd had a population of 244,274. Of these, 39.1% spoke Romanian, 19.6% Ukrainian, 12.5% Bulgarian, 12.4% Russian, 7.3% Gagauz or Turkish, 4.8% Yiddish, 2.0% German, 0.7% Greek, 0.5% Romani, 0.3% Albanian, 0.2% Polish, 0.2% Turkmen, 0.1% Belarusian, 0.1% Czech, 0.1% Tatar and 0.1% Armenian as their native language.

References

 
Uezds of Bessarabia Governorate
Bessarabia Governorate